Jeffrey Garcia is an American actor and comedian, who is best known for voicing Sheen Estevez in Jimmy Neutron: Boy Genius, and its two Nickelodeon spin-off television show series The Adventures of Jimmy Neutron, Boy Genius and Planet Sheen, as well as Pip the Mouse in Barnyard and its spin-off television show series Back at the Barnyard.

Career
Garcia began his career as a stand-up comedian, starting in 1991 at the age of fourteen, he continued his stand-up comedy through the '90s at comedy clubs in Southern California before getting into acting in 1995.

He has also performed stand-up comedy at the Laugh Factory.

Garcia is known for portraying Sheen Estevez in Jimmy Neutron: Boy Genius and its spin-off series The Adventures of Jimmy Neutron, Boy Genius and Planet Sheen on Nickelodeon. He also guest starred on the animated series Clone High. He was also the leader of the KMRK-FM 96.1 Wild Wake-Up crew. He also voices "Tyler Nelson" in The Maw franchises, "Pip" the mouse in the 2006 film Barnyard, and he continued to provide the voice of the same character for the television show Back at the Barnyard. He voiced "Rinaldo" the penguin in the 2006 film Happy Feet.

He has appeared on one of the half-hour comedy special Comedy Central Presents in May 2006. He was a contestant in the Comedy Central series Reality Bites Back, but quit after the first day. He also voiced Tipa, one of the smugglers and the bat in the 2011 animated comedy film, Rio. In the 2nd film Rio 2, he voices a spoonbill and an auditioning Spix's Macaw named Peri.

Personal life
Garcia was married to Lisa Garcia from 2002 to 2013; together they had two children: Savannah and Joseph Garcia.

Garcia has been actively involved with Gracie's Fund, a charity set up to help a young woman brutally shot by her mother. He has been promoting the fund by performing comedy shows and donating a portion of the proceeds of his online DVD and CD sales.

Filmography

Live-action

Film

Animation

Video games

Awards and nominations
 2004 - Annie Award for Outstanding Voice Acting in an Animated Television Production - Won

References

External links
 

American male video game actors
American male voice actors
1977 births
Living people
Annie Award winners
Male actors from California
People from La Puente, California
American male actors of Mexican descent
Hispanic and Latino American male actors